Solanco High School is a midsized, rural, public secondary school located in southern Lancaster County in Pennsylvania, United States.  It is a part of the Solanco School District. According to the National Center for Education Statistics, in the 2018–2019 school year, the school reported an enrollment of 1,056 pupils in grades 9th through 12th.

Extracurriculars
Solanco School District offers a variety of clubs, activities and an extensive sports program.

Sports
The district funds:

Boys
Baseball - 5A
Basketball- 5A
Cross country - AAA
Football - 5A
Golf - AAAA
Indoor track and field - AAAA
Soccer - AAA
Track and field - AAA
Wrestling	- AAA

Girls
Basketball - 5A
Cross country - AAA
Field hockey - AAA
Indoor track and field - AAAA
Soccer (Fall) - AAA
Softball - 5A
Tennis - AAA
Track and field - AAA
Volleyball - AAA

Notable alumni 

 Don Wert, Class of 1956. Professional baseball player, Detroit Tigers. 
 Šarūnas Jasikevičius, Class of 1994. Professional basketball player and coach, the 2005 Israeli Basketball Premier League MVP.

References

External links
 Solanco High School official site

Public high schools in Pennsylvania
Schools in Lancaster County, Pennsylvania